The Ivchenko AI-14 is a nine-cylinder, air-cooled, radial piston engine designed in the Soviet Union to power aircraft.

A variant known as the M462 was produced under license by Avia.

Variants
AI-14
AI-14RUnderwent state trials in December 1950 and was used in many types of light aircraft, typically used with a two-bladed propeller and is started with compressed air. Several thousand were built.
AI-14RA
AI-14V Variant for helicopters and other applications.
AI-14VF Variant for helicopters and other applications.
AI-14RF A variant uprated by Ivan Vedeneyev to 300 hp. Its further development is the Vedeneyev M14P family of engines.
Avia M462 Powers the Zlín Z 37 agricultural aircraft.
Zhuzhou HS-6 The designation for AI-14 Licence production in China.
PZL AI-14R A licensed version of the AI-14R, produced by WSK-Kalisz in Poland from 1956 until 2007.

Applications

Aero L-60 Brigadýr (L-60S variant)
Antonov An-14 - AI-14RF
ICA IS-23 - AI-14RF
Kamov Ka-15 - AI-14V
Kamov Ka-18 - AI-14VF
Kamov Ka-26
Nanchang CJ-6
PZL-101 Gawron
PZL-104 Wilga
Sever-2 (aerosled based on GAZ-M20 Pobeda passenger car)
Yakovlev Yak-12
Yakovlev Yak-18 (Yak-18A variant)

Specifications (Ivchenko AI-14RA)

See also
List of aircraft engines

References

 
 
 

1950s aircraft piston engines
Aircraft air-cooled radial piston engines
Ivchenko-Progress aircraft engines